Stereocaulon saxatile is a species of snow lichen belonging to the family Stereocaulaceae.

Ecology
Stereocaulon saxatile is a known host to the lichenicolous fungus species:

 Anzina carneonivea
 Arthonia stereocaulina
 Catillaria stereocaulorum
 Endococcus nanellus
 Odontotrema stereocaulicola
 Phaeosporobolus alpinus
 Protothelenella sphinctrinoidella
 Scutula stereocaulorum

References

Lichen species
Lichens described in 1926
Stereocaulaceae
Taxa named by Adolf Hugo Magnusson